Forzzaea is a genus of eu-bromelioids in the family Bromeliaceae, native to the Atlantic coastal forest of Brazil, and described in 2017.

Species
Currently accepted species include:

Forzzaea coutensis Leme & O.B.C. Ribeiro
Forzzaea flavipetala Leme & O.B.C. Ribeiro
Forzzaea leopoldo-horstii (Rauh) Leme, S.Heller & Zizka
Forzzaea micra (Louzada, Wand. & Versieux) Leme, S.Heller & Zizka
Forzzaea pseudomicra Leme & O.B.C. Ribeiro
Forzzaea viridifolia Leme & O.B.C. Ribeiro
Forzzaea warasii (E.Pereira) Leme, S.Heller & Zizka

References

Bromelioideae
Bromeliaceae genera